Esteban Ricardo González Maciel (born 26 January 1991) is a Uruguayan footballer who plays as a right midfielder for Gimnasia Jujuy in the Primera Nacional.

References

External links
Esteban González at playmakerstats.com (English version of ceroacero.es)

1991 births
Living people
Uruguayan footballers
Uruguayan expatriate footballers
Association football defenders
El Tanque Sisley players
Tacuarembó F.C. players
Cerro Largo F.C. players
Juventud de Las Piedras players
C.A. Progreso players
C.A. Rentistas players
Gimnasia y Esgrima de Jujuy footballers
Uruguayan Primera División players
Uruguayan Segunda División players
Primera Nacional players
Uruguayan expatriate sportspeople in Argentina
Expatriate footballers in Argentina